Moon Kyung-eun (born 27 August 1971) is a former South Korean male professional basketball player and basketball coach. He was part of the team at the 1994 Asian Games, 1996 Summer Olympics, 1998 Asian Games and 2002 Asian Games. From 2012 to 2021 he was head coach of the Korean Basketball League team Seoul SK Knights.

Early life 
One of three children, Moon attended Kwangshin Commercial High School (now Kwangshin Broadcasting Arts High School). At that time, the team did not have its own gym to practice in. Undaunted by his circumstances, the teenager would find a court and practice shooting on his own outside of school. The team still managed to achieve impressive results against more notable high school teams and even college teams, thus being dubbed a "dark horse" in Seoul's high school basketball scene during the late 1980's to early 1990's.

Playing career

College career 
Moon was heavily scouted as a high school student and went on to Yonsei University. His time at Yonsei coincided with what is often retrospectively dubbed the "golden era" of domestic college basketball. He and his teammates, as well as their counterparts from traditional athletic rivals Korea University, enjoyed a level of popularity similar to that of idol singers and A-list actors/actresses due to their skills and good looks. Together with his Yonsei teammates Lee Sang-min and Woo Ji-won and Korea University's Hyun Joo-yup and Chun Hee-chul, among others, they were collectively dubbed "Oppa Troupe" (오빠부대) by the media. As a college player, Moon became known for his accurate shooting and drew comparisons to his older contemporary shooting guard Hur Jae, despite being a forward.

Professional career 
In 1994, Moon joined the Suwon-based semi-professional team of Samsung Electronics, who famously scouted him and secured a contract with him before graduation. He enlisted for mandatory military service in 1995 and was assigned to the Sangmu team. By the time he was discharged in 1997, the professional league had just been established. Samsung was admitted as a member and Moon and most of his teammates remained with the team. He was an integral part of the Samsung team which won the 2001 KBL Championship.

In 2001, Moon signed with Incheon SK Bigs, now Daegu KOGAS Pegasus, and spent five seasons at the team. During the 2003-04 season, Woo Ji-won set the record for the most points scored in a single game in the Korean Basketball League, scoring 70 points against Changwon LG Sakers in March. On the same day Moon scored 66 points (22 three-pointers) against TG Sambo, ranking second behind Woo. The records came under scrutiny from fans and the media due to the statistical impossibility of such records occurring during a regular professional game unless collusion between players and coaches had taken place and the opposing team intentionally failing to play in a usual competitive manner to allow the respective players to achieve their records. As no evidence was ever presented to support the theory, the records still remain in the KBL's record book, but have been described as "shameful" and "embarrassing" by the media and still regarded as a taboo topic by head coaches and players of the respective teams from the two games. In later years, Moon and Woo have declined to mention the records whenever their career achievements are brought up. After the 2003-04 season, the KBL stopped issuing an award to the top scorer at its annual awards ceremony and only releases the statistics on its official website.

Moon joined Seoul SK Knights in 2006. He retired at the end of the 2009-10 season. Seoul SK Knights retired his number 10 jersey. Known for being one of the best three-point shooters during his heyday, he earned the nickname "Rambo Shooter" as he was said to resemble Rambo actor Sylvester Stallone.

Post-retirement 
Like many of his contemporaries, Moon went into coaching after retiring as a player. He was appointed head coach of Seoul SK Knights ahead of the 2012-13 season and led them to the KBL Championship five years later. His success made him one of the few head coaches to have won the KBL Championship as both a player and a head coach. His former assistant and long-time national team and club teammate Chun Hee-chul took over from the 2021-22 season as Moon was assigned to a technical advisor role with the Knights.

Since 2021, Moon has appeared in several variety shows alongside fellow retired basketball players such as Hyun Joo-yup, Hur Jae and Woo Ji-won. He and Hyun are the main cast members of the JTBC basketball-themed program Witch Fitness Basketball Club (also known as Jump Like A Witch), in which the duo try to teach female celebrities without any athletic background how to play basketball.

Personal life 
Moon has been married since 1998. He and his wife, a fellow Yonsei alumnus, have a daughter.

Filmography

Television shows

See also

References

1971 births
Living people
South Korean men's basketball players
South Korean basketball coaches
Seoul Samsung Thunders players
Daegu KOGAS Pegasus players
Seoul SK Knights players
Seoul SK Knights coaches
South Korea national basketball team players
Olympic basketball players of South Korea
Basketball players at the 1996 Summer Olympics
Basketball players at the 1994 Asian Games
Basketball players at the 1998 Asian Games
Basketball players at the 2002 Asian Games
Yonsei University alumni
Korean Basketball League players with retired numbers
Asian Games gold medalists for South Korea
Asian Games silver medalists for South Korea
Asian Games medalists in basketball
1998 FIBA World Championship players
Medalists at the 1994 Asian Games
Medalists at the 1998 Asian Games
Medalists at the 2002 Asian Games
South Korean Buddhists
1994 FIBA World Championship players